Lavillette is a community in the Canadian province of New Brunswick, in Alnwick Parish of Northumberland County. It is in the Acadian Peninsula region.

History

Notable people

See also
List of communities in New Brunswick

References

Communities in Northumberland County, New Brunswick